Danielle Amara Cotton,  (born 11 June 1969) is a British retired firefighter. From 2017–2019, she served as the Commissioner of the London Fire Brigade and was the first woman to hold this position. She had previously been the Director of Safety and Assurance at the London Fire Brigade.

In 2004 Cotton became the first woman to be awarded the Queen's Fire Service Medal. She is the Patron of Women in the Fire Service UK.

Early life and education
Cotton (known as Dany), was born on 11 June 1969, in London. As a teenager she was a member of the Air Training Corps.

Career
Cotton joined London Fire Brigade in 1988, and her first placement was at Wimbledon Fire Station. Aged 19, she had been a full firefighter for just three months when she attended the Clapham Junction rail crash. In 2007, she was assigned the post of Area Commander, becoming the highest-ranking woman in the British Fire Service, and in 2012 was made Assistant Chief Officer.

In September 2016, Cotton was appointed interim Commissioner of the London Fire Brigade following the retirement of Ron Dobson. She took up the position on 1 January 2017. Cotton initially held the title of Interim Commissioner until a restructure of the Brigade later in 2017, at which point she became full Commissioner. Commenting on the appointment of Dany Cotton as London Fire Commissioner, Young Women's Trust Chief Executive Dr Carole Easton said: "It’s great to see a woman appointed to the top job in the London Fire Brigade. It is so important that young women who are considering which career path to choose have role models in all workplaces to inspire them. The fire service has typically been dominated by men. Hopefully this appointment will encourage more young women into the London Fire Brigade".

On 14 June 2017, Cotton was called out in the middle of the night to take charge of the London Fire Brigade's response to the massive Grenfell Tower fire, which she described as "an unprecedented incident." She appeared at several media briefings to give updates on casualty figures, challenges faced and firefighters' progress.

In October 2017 she highlighted Fireman Sam in a campaign fighting sexism and promoting the gender-neutral term firefighter. She proposed that the children's character should be renamed Firefighter Sam. Cotton said that research showed that women are put off a career in the fire service because it is seen as a job for men, and that as Fireman Sam is seen by children from an early age, the name reinforces this stereotype.

On 20 June 2019, she announced she would retire in April 2020 after serving 32 years (two years longer than a normal firefighter's service) from the London Fire Brigade.

In October 2019 the retired high court judge Sir Martin Moore-Bick, who led the Grenfell Tower Inquiry, was critical of Cotton's "remarkable insensitivity" for stating in her evidence that she would not change anything the London Fire Brigade did on the night of the Grenfell fire. His report demonstrated "the LFB is an institution at risk of not learning the lessons of the Grenfell Tower fire". Survivors and bereaved welcomed Moore-Bick's comments in the first of his two reports. On Sunday 3 November 2019, The Sunday Times reported that Dany Cotton rejected the findings of the Moore-Bick inquiry into the Grenfell fire, calling them a 'stitch up'. The paper reported that her comments had angered survivors.

Following public criticism from survivors and families of victims of the Grenfell tower fire, Cotton announced 6 December 2019 that she had brought forward her date of retirement to the end of December 2019. Her replacement from 1 January 2020 was Deputy Commissioner Andrew Roe.

Cotton gave evidence to the Grenfell Inquiry for a second time in November 2020.

Honours and awards
In 2002, Cotton was named Outstanding Public Servant of the year. In the 2004 New Year Honours, Cotton became the first woman to be awarded the Queen's Fire Service Medal, given "for distinguished service." On 30 October 2008, she was awarded the Fire Brigade Long Service and Good Conduct Medal.

In 2010, she was named by The Independent as one of "100 women who changed the world". In 2014, she won the Public Service Category of the First Women Awards.

See also
London Fire Brigade
Chief Fire Officer
London Fire and Emergency Planning Authority
Chief Fire Officers Association

References

External links

 Dany Cotton interview Channel 4 News 11 July 2017
 Inverview with Nick Ferrari on LBC
Reuters Dany Cotton (6 March 2010): Chipping away at old stereotypes about women firefighters

Living people
Women in firefighting
London Fire Brigade personnel
1969 births
Place of birth missing (living people)
Recipients of the Queen's Fire Service Medal